André Diethelm (3 July 1896 – 11 January 1954) was born in Bourg-en-Bresse (Ain department) and was a French Resistance fighter and politician. As an Inspector General of Finance, he joined General de Gaulle and Free France during the Second World War, and presided over the Rally of the French People political party ( (RPF)) under the Fourth Republic.

Early life and education 
He pursued a secondary education in Foix. He was admitted to the prestigious École normale supérieure in Paris in 1914, but the war interrupted his studies just as they began.

Career 
Diethelm fought in the First World War, in Alsace, on the Eastern front, and in Greece.

After the war, he returned to the École normale supérieure but in 1919 he gave up taking the competitive civil service exam, preferring to go for the competitive exam for the Inspectorate General of Finances, in which he came in second. He was in charge of the finances of Indochina, then became director of Georges Mandel's cabinet from 1938 to 1940.

French Resistance 
Joining Free France, he was appointed commissioner for the Interior, Labour and Information, by de Gaulle, then for Finance and Pensions, and finally for Finance, the Economy and the Merchant Navy under the French National Committee in 1941–1943.

In the government of Algiers (French Committee of National Liberation, CFLN), he was commissioner for Production and Commerce, then for Supply and Production. On 4 April 1944, he became War Commissioner. And on 9 September 1944, Minister of War in the  through 21 November 1945.

Then he was deputy for the Seine-et-Oise department in 1951. Sickness forced him to give up his post, which was taken over by Jacques Chaban-Delmas. President Vincent Auriol asked him to form a government on 24 May 1953, but he refused.

Death 
Diethelm died on 11 January 1954 in Paris.

See also 

 Allies of World War II
 André Philip
 Émile Muselier
 Foreign policy of Charles de Gaulle
 Free French Africa
 French Colonial Empire
 French Fourth Republic
 French Resistance
 French Third Republic
 Georges Catroux
 Georges Thierry d'Argenlieu
 Jean Moulin
 Liberation of France
 Liberation of Paris
 Martial Valin
 Military history of France during World War II
 Paul Legentilhomme
 Philippe Auboyneau
 Philippe Pétain
 Provisional Government of the French Republic
 René Pleven
 Vichy France

References

Works cited

Further reading

External links 
 National Library of France
 2004046071 VIAF
 Library of Congress Name Authority File (LCNAF)

 

French Army officers
Members of the Chamber of Deputies (France)
French military personnel of World War I
French nationalists
Inspection générale des finances (France)
Members of the National Assembly of the French Fourth Republic
Rally of the French People politicians
World War II political leaders
1896 births
1954 deaths
Politicians from Bourg-en-Bresse
École Normale Supérieure alumni
French Ministers of Finance